This list includes all the Japanese players who played for the Japan senior national football team who are born outside Japan.while others (the minority) are naturalized or born abroad.

List by country of birth 
Last update on 25 October 2022

List of players 
Players in bold are currently playing for Japan men A, Japan women's A, Japan men U-23, Japan women's U-23,Japan men U-20, 
Japan women U-20, Japan men U-17, Japan women's U-17, Japan futsal men, Japan futsal men U-20 Japan futsal women's, Japan national beach soccer team. The list is updated as 16 October 2022

Beach Soccer

Brazil 
Ozu Moreira

Men's Football

Bolivia 
Ko Ishikawa

Brazil 
Ademir Santos
Alessandro Santos
Bruno Suzuki
Daishiro Yoshimura
Erikson Noguchipinto
George Kobayashi
George Yonashiro
Leonardo Moreira
Marcus Tulio Tanaka
Ruy Ramos
Wagner Lopes

Canada 
Noah Kenshin Browne

England 
Cy Goddard
Daniel Matsuzaka

Jamaica 
Musashi Suzuki

New Zealand 
Michael Fitzgerald

United States 
 Daniel Schmidt
 Gōtoku Sakai
 Jelani Reshaun Sumiyoshi
 Mizuki Hamada
 Zion Suzuki

Peru 
Edwin Uehara
Frank Romero

Women's Football

Thailand 
Mina Tanaka

Futsal

Argentina 
Matías Hernán Mayedonchi

Brazil 
Arthur Oliveira
Guilherme Kuromoto
Higor Pires
Rikarudo Higa
Vinicius Crepaldi

Peru 
Kaoru Morioka

See also 
 List of Japan international footballers

References

External links
 

Foreign J2 League players
Foreign footballers
Japan
Association football player non-biographical articles